Psychroteuthis glacialis, the glacial squid, is the only known species in the monotypic genus Psychroteuthis, in the family Psychroteuthidae. While only one species has been confirmed, two undescribed species also probably exist. The species occurs in coastal waters near Antarctica and South America.

Ecology
P. glacialis is known to feed on many crustaceans, fish, lanternfish, Antarctic krill, and Antarctic silverfish, and has been known to practice cannibalism. Animals known to routinely feed on glacial squid include the Antarctic petrel, light-mantled albatross, Ross seal, southern elephant seal, Weddell seal, Patagonian toothfish, wandering albatross, grey-headed albatross, the Adélie penguin, and the emperor penguin.

Distribution 
The squid inhabits the pelagic zone in subtropical regions.

References

External links

Tree of Life web project: Psychroteuthis glacialis

Squid
Molluscs described in 1920
Fauna of the Southern Ocean
Taxa named by Johannes Thiele (zoologist)